Chappell House may refer to:

Delos Allen Chappell House, Denver, Colorado, listed on the NRHP in Colorado 
Philip E. Chappell House, Kansas City, Missouri, listed on the NRHP in Missouri
Chappell Farmhouse, Cazenovia, New York, listed on the NRHP in New York 
Purefoy-Chappell House and Outbuildings, Wake Forest, North Carolina, listed on the NRHP in North Carolina
Chappell-Swedenburg House, Ashland, Oregon, listed on the NRHP in Oregon
Chappell House (Cedar Creek, South Carolina), listed on the NRHP in South Carolina